"The Lady in the Bottle" is the pilot for I Dream of Jeannie that was picked by NBC for its Fall 1965 schedule. The episode first aired on September 18, 1965. It would not air again until Fall 1970 when the series went into syndication.

Plot
Capt. Anthony Nelson (Larry Hagman) is on a rocket, on a space mission. When his final stage misfires, his one-man capsule, Stardust One, is unable to maintain orbit and he has to make an emergency landing on a desert island in the South Pacific. There, while gathering items on the beach to form a giant "S.O.S." in the sand, he finds an old bottle that seems to move. When he opens it, smoke pours out, and a 2000-year-old beautiful blonde-haired girl named Jeannie (Barbara Eden) appears, dressed in harem clothing and speaking in Persian (in the unaired version of the episode, her first words to him are translated on screen as,"Your wish is my command, Master"), and gratefully kisses him. Tony, shocked at first, realizes she's a genie, and that she can get him off the island. However, the language barrier between them is such that he can't get Jeannie to understand what an airplane or ship is, "blinking" up a falcon and an ancient galley ship instead. Frustrated, Tony idly wishes she could speak English...and she does begin to speak English ("Somehow, I must find a way to please thee, Master!"). She makes it quite clear that she is a genie and that Tony is her new master. He can wish whatever he wants and she will make that wish come true. Tony tests her, again wishing a helicopter would appear to rescue him from the island. This time, she gets it right. After it lands nearby, Tony realizes he can't take Jeannie with him; not only can't he explain her presence logically, it's left unsaid she would also complicate matters with the fiancee he is about to marry, Melissa Stone (Karen Sharpe), the daughter of his commanding officer. Tony tells Jeannie she's free of her obligation to serve him as a genie, explaining to her, "I rescued you, you rescued me - we're even". He says goodbye, and heads for home; but he doesn't see that the girl, smoking inside her bottle, rolls it into his duffel bag and returns to Cocoa Beach, Florida with him.

Upon his return to Cape Kennedy, Tony is debriefed by the base psychiatrist, Col. Alfred Bellows (Hayden Rorke). When Tony tries to explain to the doctor about seeing Jeannie, Bellows believes Tony suffered hallucinations while stranded on the island, and that the image of the "beautiful girl on a desert island" was, in his opinion, actually that of his mother. "My mother's in Salt Lake City", Tony points out. "I'm a psychiatrist", Bellows insists. "I know a mother when I see one". After dismissing Capt. Nelson, the doctor, worried about Tony's mental health, immediately phones his superior, Gen. Wingard Stone (Philip Ober).

In the meantime, Tony arrives home with Melissa. On hearing the shower in his bedroom, she wonders who could be using it. Tony doesn't know...until he sees the duffel bag with the bottle sticking out nearby. He tries to shove Melissa out, but it's too late - Jeannie appears in his bedroom doorway, clad only in his shirt. Naturally, Melissa doesn't believe Tony's explanation that "she's not a girl", yelling, "It's a GIRL!!", as she storms out. Tony insists that Jeannie leave, but she won't. "Thou hast set me free. That means that I am free to please thee", she explains. "And I am going to please thee very much...". He finally has to trick her back into her bottle to get her out of the house. Before he can release her outside, a car with Gen. Stone, Dr. Bellows, and Tony's fellow astronauts, Army Capt. Roger Healey (Bill Daily) and Navy Lt. Pete Conway (Don Dubbins), pulls up. Tony quickly dumps the bottle into a nearby garbage can as they approach him. Bellows brings up the matter of Tony's hallucination, claiming he can't reinstate him for active duty until he's certain he's "completely normal". While Tony tries to convince them he is normal, a garbage truck pulls up, and the contents of the can are dumped into it - along with Jeannie's bottle. In a panic, Tony quickly races to the truck, offers the garbage men $10 for the contents, and fishes out the bottle. Bellows and the others gently steer Tony back into his house, convinced he isn't normal. He tries to coax Jeannie out of the bottle to prove her existence, but she won't budge. Just as Dr. Bellows is about to phone for an ambulance, Tony suddenly giggles, telling them the whole incident was "just a gag", that he was just getting back at Roger and Pete for what they did to him while in training. "You really had me worried, Tony", Gen. Stone nods, accepting his explanation. "I wouldn't want a son-in-law who went around seeing genies, would I?". Tony nervously agrees, as they leave, allowing him to rest after the long day he's had. But it's not over for him, as Jeannie smokes out of her bottle, boiling mad {"I trusted thee! What manner of master art thou??"}. Tony tries to explain that she's not part of the air force, and "there's just no room for you in my life". But after floating in the air next to Jeannie, his living room briefly transformed by her into a sultan's den (complete with exotic furniture and dancing girls) — just as Gen. Stone and Melissa arrive — his nervousness as Jeannie takes on Melissa's appearance and mimics Melissa's every move and word {"Get out of that dress", Tony hisses to Jeannie, as Melissa gasps, "What??"}, her passionate kiss after the Stones leave, and his insistence that she disappear from his life by the time he wakes up in the morning, Jeannie makes it quite clear she's not leaving. After he chases her out of his bedroom when she tries to sneak under the locked door as smoke, she glances at us...and blinks the picture off. The episode is over, but not the battle of the sexes between her and Tony, as he reluctantly accepts the fact he's now "master" of a beautiful but stubborn genie who knows what's best for him.

Cast
Barbara Eden as Jeannie
Larry Hagman as Capt. Anthony Nelson
Hayden Rorke as Dr. Alfred Bellows
Philip Ober as Gen. Wingard Stone
Karen Sharpe as Melissa Stone
Bill Daily as Capt. Roger Healey
Don Dubbins as Lt. Pete Conway, USNR
Baynes Barron as Commander Ben Roberts
Joe Higgins as Second Garbage Man
Richard Reeves as First Garbage Man (Charlie)
Warren Kemmerling as Husband
Patricia Scott as Wife

Production credits
Producer: Sidney Sheldon (for Screen Gems/Columbia Pictures)
Music: Richard Wess
Director of Photography: Fred Jackman
Art Directors: Ross Bellah & Philip Jefferies
Film Editor: Al {Asa} Clark, A.C.E.
Set Decorator: Richard Mansfield
Costume Designer: Gwen Wakeling
Make-up Supervision: Ben Lane, S.M.A.
Sound Effects: Sid Lubow
Production Supervisor: Seymour Friedman
Post-production Supervisor: Lawrence Werner
Assistant Director: Herb Wallerstein
Animated Title: DePatie-Freleng Enterprises (uncredited)

Production
The episode was shot from December 2, 1964 to December 4, 1964 in black-and-white film (some reruns of the episode air digitally colorized). The unaired version of the pilot episode submitted to NBC in February 1965 has a running time of 31 minutes, with additional scenes and dialogue that were deleted from the final version that aired. NBC bought the pilot to make a full-length series.

External links

American television series premieres
1965 American television episodes
I Dream of Jeannie